Patrick Antelmi (born 15 March 1994), is an Australian professional footballer who plays as a forward for Sydney United.

Club career

Western United
On 17 July 2020, Antelmi signed for Western United for the remainder of the 2019–20 A-League season. He made his debut against Perth Glory, coming on as a substitute in the 90th minute in a 2–0 win. Antelmi was released at the end of the 2019–20 season. He immediately re-joined former club Sydney United.

Honours
With Sydney United:
  National Premier Leagues NSW Championship: 2020

With Blacktown City FC:
  National Premier Leagues NSW Championship: 2016

References

External links

1994 births
Living people
Australian soccer players
Association football midfielders
Portsmouth F.C. players
Leeds United F.C. players
Wolverhampton Wanderers F.C. players
Wigan Athletic F.C. players
Blacktown City FC players
Wollongong Wolves FC players
Sydney United 58 FC players
Western United FC players
National Premier Leagues players
A-League Men players